Stephen Alan Miller (May 31, 1940 - December 27, 1993) was an American entrepreneur, restaurateur, pedagogical expert, and creator, manufacturer, and distributor of significant educational and creative toys, a number of which were featured and sold at the Museum of Modern Art (MOMA) Gift Shop. He founded the café, The Hip Bagel on MacDougel Street in New York City's Greenwich Village with NYC restaurateur Shelly Fireman in the early 1960s. He founded the restaurant Avec. He created the 1•2•Kangaroo Toy Store, which was subsequently acquired by CBS Broadcasting as part of their Creative Playthings division. In 1969 he became the youngest president of a CBS division, Creative Playthings, at 29 years old. After leaving Creative Playthings in 1973, he became president of NOVO Toys, a subsidiary of the Sadlier Company. From 1979, until his death in 1993, he was president and major stockholder of the Willette Corporation, designers and manufacturers of vitreous china bathroom accessories in New Brunswick, NJ; a family business founded by his maternal grandparents, William and Ethel Elstein in 1921.

Biography

Miller was one of America's first advertising baby models. He was the baby featured in certain U.S. government savings and war bonds advertisements, as well as the baby emptying a can of Sherwin Williams paint over his head on a giant Times Square billboard. He was an exceptionally precocious and creative youngster who started his early entrepreneurial ventures with tiny theater performances. In his early teen years he created a Magic business complete with business cards, and was for hire as a magician at parties. His love of magic and his skill at it lasted throughout his lifetime. He also had aspirations of being an actor. He attended Temple University in 1958 for one year before moving to New York City in 1959.

The Hip Bagel

Miller's first adult entrepreneurship was the creation of the popular 1960s café, The Hip Bagel.which opened in 1963 in Greenwich Village, NYCv. The Hip Bagel was written up in Earl Wilson's New York in a chapter entitled Beardos, Weirdos, and Espressos, pages 148-149 ©1964 by Earl Wilson, published by Simon and Schuster, Rockefeller Center, 630 Fifth Avenue, NYC. Stephen Miller went on to open his next restaurant venture, Avec.

Avec

Avec, a French restaurant, opened in November, 1964, located a block from The Hip Bagel on Bleecker Street, also in Greenwich Village.  The menu at Avec was in the form of a Möbius Strip and customers were given toys to play with as they waited for their orders. Stephen and Avec were written about in the November 17, 1964 issue of The New York Herald Tribune, on page 23, in Priscilla Tucker's column.

1 • 2 • Kangaroo

At this time Stephen began what would become his lifelong focus on play and toys, and the effects of toys on the development of children and what kind of adults they become. He had recently established his unique toy store, 1 • 2 • Kangaroo, located at the triangle corner of Greenwich Avenue and Seventh Avenue. This store sold unusual toys, both antique and modern. Stephen had negotiated for the exclusive American rights to import certain European toys by such distinguished designers as Lis and Kurt Naef of Naefspiele, Peer Clahsen, Fredun Shapur, Patrick Rylands, and many others. During this time he was photographed in the nude by Diane Arbus. The store was patronized by artists Joseph Cornell, whose boxes contain some items he bought there, and the painter Marcel Duchamp who visited the store frequently. Stephen Miller and all three of his Greenwich Village ventures, The Hip Bagel, 1•2•Kangaroo, and Avec were mentioned in the November 26, 1964 edition of the Village Voice.

Creative Playthings

CBS (the Columbia Broadcasting System) acquired 1 • 2 • Kangaroo along with the exclusive distribution rights to these European toys, and made Stephen Miller President of Creative Playthings®, another CBS acquisition. He was the youngest President at 29 years old of a CBS Division. His office bookshelves were filled with toys in addition to books. Fredun Shapur, in addition to designing toys, puzzles and books for Creative Playthings® also designed their new logo. Fredun's work from this time for Creative Playthings® was featured in the September 23, 2014 edition of WIDEWALLS Magazine in a feature on Shapur's exhibition at Kemistry Gallery in London, U.K. Stephen and Creative Playthings® were featured in the January, 1970  issue of Esquire Magazine  as well as in articles in the January 1973 issue of Saturday Review. He also appeared on the David Susskind show discussing creative play for children on December 29, 1969, and in the film, Crayon People by Steven Skloot in 1982.

Obituary by artist, Ruth Ann Fredenthal

Stephen A. Miller, president and major stockholder of the Willette Corporation, Maker of vitreous china bathroom accessories in New Brunswick, New Jersey, died of pneumonia 12:07 a.m., Monday, December 27, 1993 at the St. Peters Medical Center in New Brunswick. His friends, the artist Ruth Ann Fredenthal, filmmaker David Sotnik, and toy designer and artist Pekka Korpijaakko were at his bedside. At the time of his death, Mr. Miller was also the owner of the rights and molds to produce the famous Sasha Doll, created by the Swiss sculptor, Sasha Morgenthaler.

Mr Miller was known for his original and lively personality and for his great love of dance, in particular the Russian Ballet, opera, musicals, and abstract visual art.

Born on May 31, 1940 in New York, Stephen Alan Miller began his multi-faceted career as one of America's first baby models. He was the baby advertising certain U.S. government savings and war bonds and the baby covered with paint on the Times Square billboard for Sherwin Williams paint that "Covered the World." Mr. Miller, an exceptionally precocious and creative youngster started his entrepreneurial career with tiny theatre performances, and in his early teen years, a magic business where he carried a calling card and was for hire as a magician at parties. For a while, he also had aspirations of becoming an actor. As an opera buff, he especially loved Antoinette Stella, the soprano. He once jumped on the stage at the Met with a bouquet and this incident was noted on the cover of one of her recordings. In 1958, he attended Temple University in Philadelphia for one year, after which he moved to New York City in 1959.

His first adult entrepreneurship was the creation of the popular early 1960's café, The Hip Bagel at 98 MacDougal Street in Greenwich Village. Personalities, such as Woody Allen, who mentioned the café in one of his early films, Dick Cavett, Barbra Streisand, Joan Rivers, Bob Dylan, Mabel Mercer, and others used to be regulars. In November of 1964, Mr. Miller opened a French restaurant Avec located on Bleecker Street a block away from The Hip Bagel. The menu was a Möbius Strip and the clients were given toys to play with while they waited for their orders. 

In response to his growing focus on play and toys and the effects of toys on the development of children and what kind of adults they became, he had already established the renowned toy store toy store at the corner of Greenwich and SeventhAvenue, 1•2•Kangaroo. In this store, somewhat resembling a slice of pie with an original Art Deco facade, he sold unusual toys, both antique and modern. He held the exclusive rights to import toys by such distinguished designers as Lis and Kurt Naef, Peer Clahsen, and Patrick Rylands.

He reputedly lived in an apartment in the rear of the store, and was photographed in the nude by Diane Arbus. The store was patronized by artists such as Joseph Cornell, whose boxes contain some small items he bought there, and the painter Marcel Duchamp who visited the store frequently. Mr. Miller chose toys of an abstract nature, like works of art crafted of beautiful materials which he felt would encourage the finest sensibilities of developing children while stimulating their imagination and appreciation of beauty.

In 1968, the Columbia Broadcasting System acquired 1•2•Kangaroo and made Mr. Miller president of Creative Playthings, another CBS acquisition. He was the youngest CBS president and his office bookshelves were filled with toys rather than books.

He hired the architect, Les Walker, who had designed a super cube apartment for Mr. Miller on West 9th Street, to design a store for Creative Playthings at 1 East 53rd Street (now the Museum of Broadcasting) that resembled the inside of a rocket ship. Toys were displayed on shelves of brushed aluminum and there were systems of buttons at child height that customers could push to activate flashing lights and specially composed Moog Synthesizer music by Morton Subotnik. David Gordon, the modern dancer/choreographer did the window displays. He brought the fine imported toy lines he held the rights to from 1•2•Kangaroo and added the work of other designers such as Antonio Vitali, Pekka Korpijaakko, Fredun Shapur, and Jorma Vennola. At around that time, he married Betty Ann Torregrossa ( now Falletta); they later separated and were divorced in the late 1970's.

Mr. Miller left Creative Playthings in 1973 and moved to London. He returned to New York City in 1974 and quickly became president of Novo Toys, a subsidiary of the Sadlier Company.

In 1979, Mr. Miller became president of The Willette Corporation in New Brunswick, New Jersey, a family business founded by his maternal grandparents, William and Ethel Elstein in 1921. He did not, however, leave the toy industry. He continued to attend all major international toy fairs and he had an ambitious dream to house in the vacant machine shop near the Willette plant: a toy complex–toy factory, toy library, toy museum, and toy store.

In the early 1980's, he was also on the board of directors of the Soho Repertory Theatre in New York.

In January of 1982 Mr. Miller started The Foundation for Play and Toys, a non-profit corporation to perpetuate his philosophy that... "first hand experience with toys and the play process stimulates the senses–and inspires curiosity, reason, independence, and creativity."

In 1988, Mr. Miller purchased the molds and the rights to manufacture his beloved Sasha Doll. Unfortunately, In 1990 one third of the doll's molds were stolen. In spite of this major set-back he still intended to manufacture the Sash Doll at the time of his death.

He was survived by his father Harding Miller of Highland Park, NJ, and his niece Stacey M. Miller of Edison, NJ.

A memorial service was held at Judson Memorial Church, Sunday, March 6, 1994 in the Garden Room.

References 

20th-century American businesspeople

1940 births
1993 deaths